Hamilton "Hammy" McMillan Jr. (born 29 May 1992) is a Scottish curler from Stranraer. He currently plays lead for Bruce Mouat and was part of Tom Brewster's Scotland team at 2016 European Curling Championships. He is a 2013 world junior and 2016 Scottish men's champion.

Teams

Personal life
Hammy Jr. is the son of former world champion curler Hammy McMillan. He is currently employed as a curling development officer. He lives in Glasgow.

References

External links

1992 births
Living people
Continental Cup of Curling participants
Curlers from Glasgow
European curling champions
People from Stranraer
Scottish male curlers
Curlers at the 2022 Winter Olympics
Olympic curlers of Great Britain
Medalists at the 2022 Winter Olympics
Olympic silver medallists for Great Britain
Olympic medalists in curling
Scottish Olympic medallists